Furona is a genus of longhorn beetles of the subfamily Lamiinae, containing the following species:

 Furona corniculata (Bates, 1885)
 Furona degenera (Bates, 1880)
 Furona egens (Erichson, 1847)

References

Onciderini